The Regulation of Financial Services (Land Transactions) Act 2005 (c 24) is an Act of the Parliament of the United Kingdom. The purpose of the Act is to allow Ijara products and flexible tenure products to be regulated by the Financial Services Authority.

Section 1 - Financial Services and Markets Act 2000: regulated activities
This section inserts paragraph 23A of Part 2 of Schedule 2 to the Financial Services and Markets Act 2000.

Section 2 - Short title and commencement
Section 2(1) authorises the citation of the Act by a short title.

Section 2(2) provides that the Act came into force at the end of the period of two months that began on the date on which it was passed. The word "months" means calendar months. The day (that is to say, 19 December 2005) on which the Act was passed (that is to say, received royal assent) is included in the period of two months. This means that the Act came into force on 19 February 2006.

References
Hansard

External links
The Regulation of Financial Services (Land Transactions) Act 2005, as amended from the National Archives.
The Regulation of Financial Services (Land Transactions) Act 2005, as originally enacted from the National Archives.
Explanatory notes to the Regulation of Financial Services (Land Transactions) Act 2005.

United Kingdom Acts of Parliament 2005